The crime of Gádor was the name given to the 1910 kidnapping and subsequent murder of a seven-year-old boy by Francisco Leona in Gádor, Almería, Spain. The purpose of the crime was to use the child's blood and body fat as a folk cure for a wealthy patron's tuberculosis.

Background 
At the time, it was believed that drinking the blood of a human child and using their body fat as cataplasm was a remedy for tuberculosis.

Francisco Ortega El Moruno (The Moor) had recently been diagnosed with tuberculosis and was desperately seeking a cure. He visited the local curandera Agustina Rodriguez, who in turn sent for the barber and healer Francisco Leona. Leona, who also had a criminal record, agreed to cure Ortega in exchange for 3000  reales.

Leona and Julio El Tonto (The Fool) Hernández, a son of Agustina the healer, offered to find a child. On the evening of June 27, 1910, Francisco Leona kidnapped Bernardo Gonzalez Parra, a seven-year old-from Rioja, drugged him with chloroform and put him in a sack.

Murder 
A brother of Julio "Tonto" Hernández, Joseph Hernández, was to advise the client Ortega, leaving his wife Elena to make dinner.

While Julio Hernández el Tonto distracted him, Leona covered the mouth of Bernardo Gonzalez Parra with a handkerchief bathed in chloroform. After that, both of them introduced Bernardo to a gunny sack to move him to a cortijo. Leona lay Bernardo down on a table, and held by the others, he stabbed him in the armpit while Agustina Rodríguez picked up the blood with a cooking pot and gave to Francisco Ortega.

Ortega mixed his blood with sugar and drank it. After that they took the boy to a place known as Las Pocicas where Leona killed him, crushing his skull with a rock. Then he extracted fat and mesentery to make a compress to apply to Ortega's chest.

To finish the ritual, Bernardo's body was concealed in a crevice, unburied but covered with herbs and stones, located in Las Pocicas.

When distributing the actual 3000 Ortega paid him for his services, Leona didn't share it out equally so Julio Hernández resorted to authorities and declared the crime.

Realizing Leona's intentions, Hernández told the Civil Guard who had seen the body of a child while he was chasing partridges.

Judicial and police intervention 

When law enforcement officers arrived, the people of Gádor turned Leona over to them, as he was known for his illegal and occult practices. During court proceedings, Leona indicted el Tonto Hernández in his testimony, who in turn did the same to Leona. Finally, after multiple excuses, both confessed to the crime.

Most of the perpetrators were executed by hanging. Leona was sentenced to death by garrote, but died in prison. The client, Ortega, and Agustina, the curandera, were both sentenced to death. Joseph Hernández, was sentenced to 17 years in prison while his wife, Elena, was acquitted. Julio el Tonto was sentenced to death too, but received a pardon on grounds of insanity following a psychiatric report.

Francisco Leona Romero

Francisco Leona (1835–1910) was a Spanish child killer, barber, curandero, and Sacamantecas from the region of Gádor, Almería, who was arrested and convicted of murdering seven-year-old Bernardo Gonzalez Parra for the purpose of using the boy's blood and fat as a tuberculosis treatment for a wealthy farmer, Francisco Ortega.

Aftermath 
This crime gave rise to the terms Hombre del saco and Sacamantecas, because the kidnapers used a gunny sack to carry  the child. It was defined as "medical crime", inspired by folk beliefs about the medicinal properties of human blood and children's manteca.

A TV episode named El sacamantecas was released in 1986. A documentary directed by Juan Francisco Viruega and named La cicatriz was released on 21 November 2019 during the Festival de Cine de Almería.

References

Bibliography 

 
 
 

1910 in Spain
Deaths by person in Spain
History of Almería
June 1910 events
Tuberculosis
European traditional medicine
1910s murders in Spain
Incidents of cannibalism